The 2018 Total Spa 24 Hours was the 70th running of the Spa 24 Hours endurance race. It was also the fourth round of the 2018 Blancpain GT Series Endurance Cup and was held on 28 and 29 July at the Circuit de Spa-Francorchamps, Belgium.

Entry list 

The following drivers will attend the 2018 24 Hours of Spa:

Qualifying
These were the 10 fastest cars in qualifying

Race

Race Result

References 

Spa 24 Hours
Spa
Spa
24